Keach's Catechism (also known as the 1677 Baptist Catechism or 1693 Baptist Catechism) is a Reformed Baptist catechism consisting of a set of 118 basic questions and answers from scripture teaching readers the basics of the Reformed Baptist faith.

The Catechism is similar to the earlier Heidelberg Catechism and Westminster Catechism except for the sections on baptism.  It followed the 1677 Baptist Confession which was later ratified by over 100 baptist congregations in England and Wales as the 1689 Baptist Confession of Faith, which was signed by Hanserd Knollys, William Kiffin, Benjamin Keach, and others..  The Confession was written by English Particular Baptists, who held to a Calvinistic analysis to give a formal scriptural explanation of their Christian faith from a Baptist perspective.  One of the preachers active in creating Confession of Faith, Benjamin Keach, is often credited with the writing of the Baptist Catechism commonly known as "Keach's Catechism", although it was likely compiled by William Collins, Keach's associate in drafting the Confession. The catechism was officially published by the British Baptists in 1693. The confession which the catechism was based upon was later adopted by the Philadelphia Baptist Association in 1742 in America.

References

External links
 .

 .

1677 works
1693 works
Calvinist texts
Catechisms
Baptist Christianity in England
17th-century Christian texts
Baptist statements of faith
Reformed confessions of faith
17th-century Calvinism
History of Christianity in England